The National Space Institute was a space advocacy group, the first of its kind, established by  Dr. Wernher von Braun to help maintain the public's support for the United States space program.  It has since merged, in 1987, with the L5 Society founded by fans of the Space Colonization and Industrialization work of Dr. Gerard K. O'Neill, to become the present-day National Space Society.

Founding
In its earliest stages of formation in June 1974, NSI was first known as the "National Space Association", but was renamed from "Association" to "Institute" in April 1975. Von Braun was the NSI's first president, but shortly became chairman, with journalist and former ABC-TV 20/20 host Hugh Downs as president. Charles C. Hewitt was the first executive director.

Downs later recalled the beginning of the organization: 

At the first annual meeting of the organization, in July 1975, von Braun said: 

Initial members serving on the NSI board of directors and governors were a veritable "Who's Who" list that included comedian and entertainer Bob Hope, singer/songwriter John Denver, oceanographer Jacques-Yves Cousteau, "Original 7" Project Mercury astronaut and Senator John H. Glenn Jr., Apollo 8 astronaut Frank Borman, Apollo 11 astronauts Buzz Aldrin and Michael Collins, Dr. Michael DeBakey, "Star Trek" creator Gene Roddenberry and actress Nichelle Nichols.

Toward the end of 1975, von Braun commented on the state of the general public's interest in the space program.

Relationship with Omni magazine
After some years of publishing a newsletter that became known as INSIght, the Institute entered into an arrangement with the publishers of Omni magazine whereby all members except life members would receive that magazine as part of their membership. Omni editor Ben Bova joined the NSI board, then became vice president and finally succeeded Downs as president. He continued as president after the Omni arrangement was discontinued and an agreement was made with Palmer Publications to make their monthly general space interest magazine Space World the official NSI member magazine.

When von Braun died in June 1977, Hugh Downs became Chairman of the Board and, after a time, Ben Bova assumed the presidency.  After Hewitt departed in 1980, Courtney Stadd served for a period as General Manager.  The Institute was then led until 1984 by executive director Dr. Mark R. Chartrand, followed by Dr. Glen P. Wilson.

Merger
Under Bova and Wilson, the arrangements for merger with the L5 Society were concluded, and the name change to National Space Society was announced in advance of the merger, with vague explanations to the members. Since the merger, it has been claimed that the name change took place upon the merger, but the historical record to the contrary is clear.  Following the merger, Wilson was succeeded by his assistant, Lori Garver. The merged organization has continued to use the NSS name and logo after a joint membership vote was taken in 1987 to determine whether or not to change it to the "Space Frontier Society."

A more complete history of the National Space Institute is contained in a series of articles published in the November/December 1994 issue of Ad Astra, the magazine of the NSS.

See also
Space advocacy

Notes

External links
L5 News Archive
A Brief History of the L5 Society
NSS Chapters Story
NSS Worldwide
NSSA History - The 70's
NSSA History - The 80's
NSSA History - The 90's
NSSA History - The Present
National Space Society Official web site.
Ad Astra Online Online edition of magazine
National Space Society Chapters Network Resources for NSS chapters, members and space activists.

Space science organizations
Space advocacy organizations
Institutes based in the United States
Scientific organizations based in the United States
Space colonization
1974 in science
Organizations established in 1974
Organizations disestablished in 1987
1974 establishments in Washington, D.C.
1987 disestablishments in Washington, D.C.
Wernher von Braun